The Africa Centre, London was founded in 1964 at 38 King Street, Covent Garden, where over the years it held many art exhibitions, conferences, lectures, and a variety of cultural events, as well as housing a gallery, meeting halls, restaurant, bar and bookshop. The Africa Centre closed its original venue in 2013, and now has a permanent home at 66 Great Suffolk Street, Southwark, south London. It is a registered charity.

History
The Africa Centre was opened in 1964 by Kenneth Kaunda at the Grade II-listed 38 King Street. The building, which had been a banana warehouse in the 18th century and subsequently an auction house, was "given by the Catholic Church in perpetuity to the people of Africa in 1962".

The idea for the centre was conceived in 1961 by Margaret Feeny, whose aim (as described by Lloyd Bradley) was "to foster non-governmental relations between newly independent African nations by bringing people together on neutral apolitical ground. It would also maintain informal cultural links between Britain and her former colonies, while offering a friendly meeting place for Africans living in London."

Archbishop Desmond Tutu used to meet Thabo Mbeki at the bar, and described it as a home "to all who are Africans, and all those who have a care for the interests of the continent and its people". In the words of Richard Dowden, "it became The Place for African presidents, freedom fighters, writers and artists to speak and debate. You could find everything African there, from Ghanaian food to fierce debates and fantastic parties. Sometimes all three at the same time on a Saturday night; a High Life or Congolese band playing to a crammed floor of dancers while below in the basement radicals and reactionaries sipped pepper soup and argued about evolutionary versus revolutionary change. During the week there were talks about art, African dance lessons, films and plays." The Association for the Teaching of African and Caribbean Literature (ATCAL) was among the influential organisations that used the Africa Centre's facilities, holding its inaugural conference ("How to teach Caribbean and African literature in schools") there in 1979.

The centre held frequent exhibitions. Five Black Women in 1983, with Sonia Boyce, Claudette Johnson, Lubaina Himid, Houria Niati and Veronica Ryan, was the first "widely respected" exhibition featuring black women artists. A large mural by Malangatana Ngwenya that decorated the stairwell of the centre's original building in Covent Garden has now been installed in the Africa Centre's new premises in Southwark.

The centre has had a long association with music. In 1975, Wala Danga, a Zimbabwean promoter and sound engineer, organised his first club night there. As he told Lloyd Bradley: "The Africa Centre was unique... One of the first places that people from different African countries really used to mix, because for a lot of the African students it was like a home away from home." In the 1970s and 1980s, political movements including the Anti-Apartheid Movement would also provide the backdrop for concerts at the centre. In October 1981, South African UK-based Angelique Rockas premiered a performance of the anti-junta, anti-fascist drama El Campo (The Camp) by Griselda Gambaro. In 1983, the first clubnight was held at the centre – the "Limpopo Club", which would host artists such as Youssou N'Dour, Angélique Kidjo, and Salif Keita. From 1985 to 1989, Jazzie B would bring to the centre his Soul II Soul sound system, which would acquire "legendary status".

In 2005, the London Art and Artists Guide described it as a "very lively arts centre" that held classes in dance, movement, and literature, and hosted meetings in the evenings; and The Calabash, London's first African restaurant, was considered "well worth a visit". The bookshop sold books published only in Africa, as well as "excellent handicrafts and sculpture".

In August 2012, the building at King Street was sold to the property developer. This was despite a concerted campaign to save the Africa Centre at its original premises, supported by Desmond Tutu, Wole Soyinka, Ngugi Wa Thiong'o, Yinka Shonibare, Bonnie Greer, Sokari Douglas Camp and others. The centre moved to Great Suffolk Street in Southwark, where it now resides permanently.

In 2018, Kenneth Olumuyiwa Tharp was appointed as director of the Africa Centre, holding the position until a management restructure in 2020.

The Africa Centre maintains a link with Covent Garden by having an annual Summer Festival in August on the Piazza, since 2013.

The Africa Centre launched its refurbished new headquarters at 66 Great Suffolk Street in Southwark in June 2022.

Centre directors
Margaret Feeny (1964–1978)
Alastair Niven (1978–1984)
Nigel Watt (1984–1991)
Adotey Bing (1992–2006)
Kenneth Olumuyiwa Tharp (2018–2020)

References

External links
 
 Niven, Alastair, "The Africa Centre in London", Research in African Literatures, Vol. 10, No. 2, Special Issue on African Song (Autumn 1979), pp. 274–276. Published by Indiana University Press.
 Jason Okundaye, "The Africa Centre is back. Now will Britain finally embrace all of its cultural heritage?", The Guardian, 1 July 2022.

1964 establishments in England
Black British culture in London
Black British history
Cultural organisations based in London
African culture